Luyten or (Luijten, Luiten) is a Dutch patronymic or matronymic surname. Luit, Luite, Luitje are male and female given names, usually short forms of Luitgard and particularly popular in the Middle Ages due to the female Saint Lutgardis of Tongeren (1182–1246). People with this name include

Cor Luiten (1929–1978), Dutch football forward
Henri Luyten (1873–1954), Belgian racing cyclist
Henry Luyten or Jan Hendrik Luyten (1859–1945), Dutch-born Belgian painter
Jo Luijten (born 1978), Dutch video comedian and video game developer
Joost Luiten (born 1986), Dutch golfer
Louis Luyten (born 1955), Belgian racing cyclist
Magali Luyten (born 1978), Belgian rock singer
Rik Luyten (1931–1969), Belgian racing cyclist
Willem Jacob Luyten (1899–1994), Dutch-American astronomer

See also
Luyten (disambiguation), with a list of astronomic objects named after Willem Jacob Luyten
Jan Luiten van Zanden (born 1955), Dutch economic historian
Luyt, surname of similar origin

References

Dutch-language surnames
Matronymic surnames
Patronymic surnames